Patton Jones Yorke was a plantation owner and politician in Louisiana. He represented Carroll Parish in the Louisiana House of Representatives. He served from 1868 to 1873.

He was the eldest son of Louis S. Yorke and Adelaide née Patton Yorke. Patton served as a cavalry officer in the U.S. Army during the American Civil War. According to a family history he achieved the rank of colonel with a New Jersey cavalry unit. He married Rebecca Coleman in 1865.

He gave testimony about election issues.

References

People of North Carolina in the American Civil War
Union Army officers
People from Wilmington, North Carolina
Year of birth missing